The Kodava Maaple, also known as Jamma Maaple, is a Muslim community residing in Kodagu district of Karnataka in southern India. They are Sunnis of the Shafi'i madhab, and contract marriage alliances with Mappilas and Bearys. They speak Malayalam, although now they do follow some Mappila and Beary customs also.

History
The Madikeri the capital taluk of Kodagu had been renamed to Zafarabad by the Sultan in the meanwhile. The Muslim descendants of the Kodavas who converted into Islam, after Tipu Sultan's army on various forays into Coorg are called Kodava Mappila.

During the Third Anglo-Mysore War (1789–1792) 5,000 Kodava men along with their families, escaped from captivity in Seringapatam and returned to Coorg. During the war in 1791, one night the British attacked the Sultan's army which fled. That day the Asadulai (converts) who were seized at Coorg and other places along with the Neze Cardar (lancers), all numbering 10,000 people, escaped with their weapons to Coorg. Tipu's batteries were taken and there was confusion among Tipu's troops during that nightly encounter. According to Moegling, Kodavas, who had been carried away by Tipu with their wives and children, made their escape and returned to their native country (Coorg). These converts remained Muslims as they didn't reconvert to Hinduism,

The descendants of these Muslims, many of them now inter-married with Mappilas of Kerala and Bearys of Tulu Nadu, constitute a very small minority in modern Kodagu. In spite of their change in faith, they maintained their original clan names and dress habits and speak Kodava takk, although now they do follow some Mappila–Beary customs also. Today, many Muslims bear Kodava family names. There is Kathanira , Joypera , Periyanda ,  Alira, koovalera, Cheeranda, Chimma Cheera, Duddiyanda, Kaddadiyanda, and Kolumanda in Virajpet.

Culture and language

The Kodava Maaple follow the culture of the Malabar Mappila and Kodava people. Many of them retain their ancestral family or clan names. Traditionally, Kodava Maaple men wore the Kodava attire. They now contract marriage alliances with the Muslims of Mangalore and Kerala as well. They generally speak in Kodava takk, although now some of them speak in Malayalam and Beary Bashe due to intermarriages. Their culture is very similar to the Kerala Muslims, because they follow the mixed culture of the Kodavas and Malabar  Muslims.

Muslims of the Syed and the Sheikh clans who were on good terms with Kodavas and their Raja were allowed to remain in Kodagu after the fall of Tipu Sultan. They speak Urdu.

Yemmemadu Dargah is the main shrine of the Kodava Muslims and is revered by the Kodava Hindus as well. This dargah is located in a place called Yemmemadu in Kodagu district. There is an annual Urs held at this place which goes on for around eight days and more than two lakh devotees from all religions across the state come here to participate and get the blessings of the Sufi saints. Women are denied entry into the dargah and separate arrangements are made to enable them to offer prayers.

Other Kodagu Muslim communities
Coorg has a significant Muslim population who are Syeds and Sheikhs who speak Urdu at home or Mappilas who speak Malayalam at home. There are Beary Bhashe speaking Beary Muslims and Nawayathi speaking Nawayath Muslims as well.

Citations

References

.
.
.

Kodava people
Muslim communities of Karnataka
Social groups of Karnataka
Islam in India